Territorial Assembly  elections were held in Senegal on 30 March 1952. The Senegalese Democratic Bloc won 41 of the 50 seats.

Electoral system
Unlike other French colonies in Africa which used a dual college system, with French citizens electing part of the General Council and Africans electing the remainder, the Senegalese General Council was elected on a general roll.

Results

References

Elections in Senegal
Senegal
1952 in Senegal
Election and referendum articles with incomplete results
March 1952 events in Africa